Peace Minus One is a studio album by the industrial metal band Rorschach Test, released in 2000.

Production
The album was produced by Neil Kernon.

Critical reception
CMJ New Music Report wrote: "One part raw metal and one part industrial, the digitized Peace Minus One is sharper than a bag full of razor blades." The Columbus Dispatch called singer James Baker "unfailingly guttural," and dismissed the album as "a new collection of disenchantment." The Seattle Times called the album "brutal, raw, savage—yet also oddly 'sensitive,' albeit in a hard-boiled way," writing that "Baker's creepy voice is perfect for growling scary prophecies over guest musician Jeff Loomis' speed-metal guitar."

Track listing
All tracks composed by James Baker and Kerr unless noted.

References

2000 albums
Rorschach Test (band) albums